Norberto Edgardo Fontana (born 20 January 1975) is an Argentine racing driver. He participated in four Formula One Grands Prix, debuting on 29 June 1997 but scoring no championship points.

His opportunity to race came as a result of two separate injuries sustained by regular Sauber driver Gianni Morbidelli during the 1997 season. During the 1997 European Grand Prix, Fontana had gained attention for apparently blocking Jacques Villeneuve to let rival Michael Schumacher pull away from the Canadian. He attempted to enter with the Tyrrell team for 1998 but was dropped in favour for Brazilian Ricardo Rosset and with Minardi for 2000. In between his time in F1, Fontana raced in Formula Nippon. In 2010 he won the Konex Award as one of the five best Racing Drivers of the last decade in Argentina.

Early career
Fontana was born in Arrecifies, Buenos Aires as the son of Hector and Clara Fontana. He started racing at the age of 8 at the Summer Night Championship in Lujan. In 1989, he began a full season of karting and finished 2nd in the Youth Kart Championship of Buenos Aires Province. The following year, Fontana progressed to a higher level of championship and finished 4th. In 1992, he moved into car racing and competed in the Formula Renault Argentina series before moving into the European series events in 1993.

Fontana raced in the German Formula Three Championship series in 1994 and 1995, winning the 1995 title as well as that year's Marlboro Masters event at Zandvoort circuit. He claimed the title ahead of drivers including Ralf Schumacher, Alexander Wurz, Jarno Trulli and Jan Magnussen.

In 1996, Fontana entered Formula Nippon for the Nova Engineering team driving a Lola T96/51 Mugen. His highlights were finishing 2nd twice in Fuji in a season that included multiple accidents, mechanical failures and poor results. For 1997, he drove for the Le Mans team in their Reynard 97D Mugen. The season started badly but made a comeback to finish 5th in Fuji, a win at Mine and 3rd in Motegi.

Formula One
Fontana joined the Sauber test team in 1995 when Peter Sauber approached him for a test session that took place at Barcelona in late 1994. He retained this role throughout 1995 and 1996.

1997
Fontana made his Formula One debut at the 1997 French Grand Prix replacing Gianni Morbidelli who had broken his arm prior to the race. He qualified 20th and retired when he understeered and ended up in a gravel trap. Prior to the British GP, team principal Peter Sauber looked for replacements to take Fontana's seat but eventually decided to keep Fontana on board. During qualifying, he missed a red light indicating that the car must come in for a mandatory weight check. Fontana drove past the light and was forced to start at the back of the grid. In the race, Fontana finished 9th despite his right leg becoming numb. At Hockenheim, he started 18th and finished 9th despite spinning early on.

At the 1997 European Grand Prix in Jerez, Fontana received a $5,000 fine for speeding in the pitlane and eventually qualified 18th. During the race, Fontana appeared to block Jacques Villeneuve, who was the direct rival of Ferrari driver Michael Schumacher at the time. ITV commentator Martin Brundle pointed out that the Sauber team used Ferrari engines at the time. Fontana eventually finished 14th with his highlight being overtaking Jos Verstappen with two wheels on the grass.

Attempted comebacks
Fontana was considered as a driver for the dying Tyrrell team for 1998 with team principal Ken Tyrrell negotiating with the Argentine. Fontana signed a draft contract, but did not sign the final contract as the owners British American Tobacco had vetoed the suggestion and Tyrrell was forced to sign Brazilian Ricardo Rosset who had more sponsorship brought to the team. In 1999, Fontana tested with Minardi for a seat that would partner Marc Gené. However, sponsorship once again caused the Argentine to lose the seat for a possible comeback.

Post-Formula One
Fontana decided to return to Formula Nippon and finished 4th in the series which included a win in Fuji. He also competed in the Japanese GT Championship and was paired with Masanori Sekiya. The pair finished 6th in Suzuka, 3rd at Sendai and Motegi. The pair finished 7th in the championship.

Touring car racing

He subsequently moved into Argentine touring car racing, driving in the Turismo Carretera,. TC2000 and Top Race V6. In the TC2000 he was seventh in 2001, champion in 2002, third in 2003, seventh in 2006, eighth in 2008, fourth in 2009 and champion again in 2010. Until 2009 he drove for Toyota, given the relationship he had with the brand when he raced in Japan. Since 2010 he drives a works Ford. Fontana also competed at the 2011 Dakar Rally in a buggy.

Racing record

Complete Formula Nippon results
(key) (Races in bold indicate pole position) (Races in italics indicate fastest lap)

Complete International Formula 3000 results
(key) (Races in bold indicate pole position) (Races in italics indicate fastest lap)

Complete Formula One results
(key)

Complete JGTC results
(key) (Races in bold indicate pole position) (Races in italics indicate fastest lap)

Complete CART results
(key)

References

External links

Fontana web

1975 births
Living people
People from Arrecifes
Argentine racing drivers
Argentine Formula One drivers
Sauber Formula One drivers
German Formula Three Championship drivers
Champ Car drivers
Formula Nippon drivers
Turismo Carretera drivers
TC 2000 Championship drivers
Top Race V6 drivers
Formula Renault Argentina drivers
International Formula 3000 drivers
Dakar Rally drivers
EFDA Nations Cup drivers
24H Series drivers
Súper TC 2000 drivers
Sportspeople from Buenos Aires Province
Fortec Motorsport drivers
Team LeMans drivers